UMAX can stand for:
"UMAX Technologies", a manufacturer of computer products.
"μMAX", Maxim Name for a MSOP ic Package.